Qeshlaq-e Khan Hoseyn Vadelan Hajj Mohammad Taqi (also Romanized as Qeshlāq-e Khān Ḩoseyn Vadelān Ḩājj Moḩammad Taqī) is a village in Qeshlaq-e Sharqi Rural District, Qeshlaq Dasht District, Bileh Savar County, Ardabil Province, Iran. At the 2006 census, its population was 62, in 11 families.

References 

Towns and villages in Bileh Savar County